Sidney Municipal Airport may refer to:

 Sidney Municipal Airport (Nebraska) (Lloyd W. Carr Field) in Sidney, Nebraska, United States (FAA: SNY)
 Sidney Municipal Airport (New York) in Sidney, New York, United States (FAA: N23)
 Sidney Municipal Airport (Ohio) in Sidney, Ohio, United States (FAA: I12)
 Sidney-Richland Municipal Airport in Sidney, Montana, United States (FAA: SDY)